Jacob Krop (born 4 June 2001) is a Kenyan long-distance runner.

Career
Krop ran 5000 metres in 13:14.44, his personal best, in Abidjan on 19 April 2019. After placing 4th at the Kenyan Trials, he qualified on the same distance for the final at the 2019 World Athletics Championships in Doha. He competed at the 2022 World Athletics Championships and won a silver medal in the men's 5000 metres event.

References

External links

Kenyan male long-distance runners
World Athletics Championships athletes for Kenya
2001 births
Living people
People from West Pokot County
21st-century Kenyan people
Commonwealth Games bronze medallists for Kenya
Commonwealth Games medallists in athletics
Athletes (track and field) at the 2022 Commonwealth Games
Medallists at the 2022 Commonwealth Games